The 2018–19 Nicholls Colonels women's basketball team represented Nicholls State University during the 2018–19 NCAA Division I women's basketball season. The Colonels, led by eleventh year head coach DoBee Plaisance, played their home games at Stopher Gym and are members of the Southland Conference.  The Colonels finished the 2018–19 season 20–12, 14–4 in Southland play to finish in third place. They lost to Texas A&M–Corpus Christi in the second round of the Southland women's tournament.  They received an invitation to the 2019 Women's Basketball Invitational tournament where they lost in the first round to Southern Miss.

Previous season
The Colonels finished the 2017–18 season 19–13, 11–7 in Southland play to finish in a three way tie for fourth place. They won their first Southland women's tournament and earned an automatic trip to their first NCAA women's tournament in school history where they lost in the first round to Mississippi State.

Schedule
Sources:

|-
!colspan=12 style=";"| Exhibition

|-
!colspan=12 style=";"| Non-conference regular season

|-
!colspan=12 style=";"| Southland regular season

|-
!colspan=12 style=";"| Southland Women's Tournament

|-
!colspan=12 style=";"| WBI Tournament

See also
2018–19 Nicholls Colonels men's basketball team

References

Nicholls Colonels women's basketball seasons
Nicholls State
Nicholls
Nicholls
Nicholls